Aydın Adnan Sezgin (born 13 July 1956) is a Turkish diplomat and a politician. He is one of the founders of the Good Party which was established in 2017. He is a member of the Turkish Parliament.

Biography
Sezgin was born in Aydın on 13 July 1956. He is a graduate of Tevfik Fikret High School. He received a degree in economy from Hacettepe University. During his studies at Hacettepe he was a member of the Justice Party and served in its youth branch in Ankara. He obtained his Ph.D. in economy and anthropology from Paris-Panthéon-Assas University. His thesis was about economy and civilization. 

In 1982 Sezgin joined the Ministry of Foreign Affairs and served in different diplomatic posts until 2010 when he was named as the ambassador of Turkey to Russia. In 2014 he was appointed ambassador of Turkey to Italy. He retired from diplomatic post in late 2016. He involved in the establishment of the Good Party in 2017. In the 2018 elections Sezgin was elected from Aydın and has been a member of the 27th term of the Parliament.

Sezgin's wife is Ayşe Sezgin who is also a diplomat. They have a daughter.

References

20th-century Turkish diplomats
21st-century Turkish diplomats
1956 births
Living people
Ambassadors of Turkey to Russia
Ambassadors of Turkey to Italy
Hacettepe University alumni
People from Aydın
Good Party politicians
Members of the 27th Parliament of Turkey
Turkish political party founders
Paris 2 Panthéon-Assas University alumni
Justice Party (Turkey) politicians